Romain Feillu (born 16 April 1984) is a French former road racing cyclist, who rode professionally between 2006 and 2019. He is the older brother of Brice Feillu, who also competed professionally as a cyclist.

Career
Feillu was born in Châteaudun, Eure-et-Loir. In August 2005, Feillu joined  as a trainee (stagiaire) and impressed his team managers, resulting in a professional contract. During the 2006 season he won the Grand Prix Tours as well as the overall rankings of the Tour de la Somme. In 2007 he won a stage in the Tour de Luxembourg and the Circuit de l'Aulne. In that year he also made his Tour de France debut finishing three times in the top 10 in mass sprints. He withdrew after stage 8, which was the second mountain stage. Later that year he won the Tour of Britain and the late season Paris–Bourges.

At the end of the 2009 season, he won the Grand Prix de Fourmies. He won this race again in 2010.

Feillu joined  for the 2014 season, after his previous team –  – folded at the end of the 2013 season.

Major results

2005
 7th Overall Tour de la Somme
 8th Paris–Bourges
 8th Paris–Tours Espoirs
2006
 1st  Overall Tour de la Somme
 1st Grand Prix Tours
 2nd  Road race, UCI Under-23 Road World Championships
 2nd La Côte Picarde
 4th Overall Giro della Toscana
 5th Grand Prix de la Ville de Lillers
 10th Overall Tour de Normandie
2007
 1st  Overall Tour of Britain
 1st Boucles de l'Aulne
 1st Paris–Bourges
 4th Cholet-Pays de Loire
 4th Châteauroux Classic
 7th Grand Prix d'Isbergues
 8th Overall Tour de Picardie
 8th Overall Boucles de la Mayenne
 10th Overall Tour de Luxembourg
1st Stage 3
 10th Paris–Tours
2008
 1st Boucles de l'Aulne
 3rd Châteauroux Classic
 7th Overall Boucles de la Mayenne
 8th GP Ouest–France
 Tour de France
 &  Held after Stage 3
2009
 1st Grand Prix de Fourmies
 1st Stage 4 Tour du Limousin
 2nd Overall Tour de Picardie
1st  Points classification
1st  Young rider classification
1st Stage 2
 2nd Paris–Camembert
 2nd Châteauroux Classic
 3rd Route Adélie
 5th Boucles du Sud Ardèche
 5th Grand Prix de Wallonie
 7th Tour du Finistère
 7th Grand Prix de la Somme
 8th Paris–Brussels
 9th Cholet-Pays de Loire
 10th Paris–Bourges
2010
 1st Grand Prix de Fourmies
 Vuelta a Burgos
1st  Points classification
1st Stage 4
 1st Stage 2 Tour de l'Ain
 2nd Châteauroux Classic
 2nd Paris–Brussels
 2nd Paris–Bourges
 3rd Grand Prix d'Isbergues
 4th Kampioenschap van Vlaanderen
 5th Cholet-Pays de Loire
 6th Paris–Tours
 10th Road race, UCI Road World Championships
 10th Grand Prix d'Ouverture La Marseillaise
 10th GP Ouest–France
2011
 1st  Overall Tour de Picardie
1st Stage 2
 1st Tour du Finistère
 Tour Méditerranéen
1st Stages 2, 3 & 4
 1st Stage 5 Circuit de Lorraine
 1st Stage 5 Tour de Luxembourg
 2nd Grand Prix de Denain
 3rd Grand Prix d'Ouverture La Marseillaise
 6th Road race, UCI Road World Championships
 7th Grand Prix Pino Cerami
 7th Grand Prix de Fourmies
 7th Grand Prix d'Isbergues
 8th Paris–Bourges
2012
 2nd Grand Prix Pino Cerami
 3rd Boucles de l'Aulne
 4th Scheldeprijs
 5th Classic Loire Atlantique
 6th Cholet-Pays de Loire
 7th Le Samyn
 9th Tro-Bro Léon
 9th Grand Prix de Plumelec-Morbihan
2013
 2nd Grand Prix Pino Cerami
 8th Kampioenschap van Vlaanderen
 9th Scheldeprijs
 9th Grand Prix d'Isbergues
 10th Tour de Vendée
2014
 2nd Châteauroux Classic
 3rd Overall Ronde de l'Oise
1st Stage 1
 10th Grand Prix de Fourmies
2015
 1st Route Adélie
 5th Paris–Bourges
 7th Omloop van het Houtland
 8th Grand Prix d'Isbergues
 10th Arnhem–Veenendaal Classic
2016
 2nd Grand Prix d'Isbergues
 3rd Paris–Camembert
 4th Grand Prix de Fourmies
 4th Tour de Vendée
 5th Tour du Finistère
 6th Paris–Troyes
 7th La Drôme Classic
 7th Paris–Bourges
2017
 10th La Roue Tourangelle
2018
 3rd Grand Prix de la ville de Pérenchies
2019
 2nd Grand Prix de la Somme
 4th Grand Prix de la ville de Pérenchies
 9th Route Adélie

References

External links

1984 births
Living people
People from Châteaudun
French male cyclists
Sportspeople from Eure-et-Loir
Cyclists from Centre-Val de Loire